Hugh J Sachs (born 25 February 1964) is an English actor, best known for his role as Gavin Ramsbottom in the ITV hit sitcom Benidorm.

Career
Sachs has appeared in numerous television shows and films, including Aristocrats, Foyle's War, Midsomer Murders, The Catherine Tate Show, My Family and Footballers' Wives. His film credits include The Libertine, Like Minds, Love, Honour and Obey, and Mad Dogs and Englishmen. Sachs also appeared as Godfrey in Victoria Wood's 2006 production Housewife, 49.

In 2012 Sachs appeared in Secrets and Words, a BBC Learning show about adult literacy, and 2013, he appeared as Harry Dangle in the West End play One Man, Two Guvnors at the Theatre Royal, Haymarket in London opposite Rufus Hound.

Sachs is a board member of The Theatrical Guild.

Credits

Television

Film

References

External links
Hugh on Twitter

Living people
British people of German descent
English male television actors
English male film actors
1964 births